Reece Robson (born 18 June 1998) is an Australian professional rugby league footballer who plays as a  for the North Queensland Cowboys in the NRL.

He previously played for the St. George Illawarra Dragons in the National Rugby League and at representative level has played for the Prime Minister's XIII.

Background
Robson was born in Murwillumbah, New South Wales, Australia.

He played junior rugby league for the Murwillumbah Colts and the Bilambil Jets, before moving to Sydney. In Sydney, he attended Endeavour Sports High School and played junior rugby league for De La Salle Caringah. In 2016, while attending Endeavour Sports High, he represented the Australian Schoolboys.

Playing career

Early career
In 2014, Robson was a member of the Cronulla-Sutherland Sharks Harold Matthews Cup squad. In 2015, he joined the St. George Dragons SG Ball Cup side. In 2016, despite still being SG Ball Cup-eligible, Robson moved up to the St. George Illawarra under-20 side, where he played 36 games over two seasons, scoring nine tries. Later that season, he started at hooker for the New South Wales under-18 side. In November 2016, he re-signed with St. George Illawarra until the end of the 2019 NRL season. In 2017, he was selected to start at hooker for the New South Wales under-20 and Junior Kangaroos sides.

2018
In 2018, Robson joined St. George's NRL squad and spent the majority of the season playing for their New South Wales Cup side, winning their Player of the Year award. He again represented the New South Wales under-20 and Junior Kangaroos sides in 2018.

In Round 9 of the 2018 NRL season, Robson made his debut off the bench in St. George's 34–14 win over Melbourne.
On September 10 at the Brad Fittler medal awards, Robson won the award for NSW Under-20 Player of the Year. In October, he represented the Prime Minister's XIII in their win over the PNG Prime Minister's XIII.

2019
On 6 May, Robson was selected for the NSW Residents side that lost to the Queensland Residents. On 12 August, Robson signed a four-year deal with the North Queensland Cowboys, starting in 2020.

2020
In February, Robson was a member of the North Queensland 2020 NRL Nines winning squad, scoring a try in the final against his former club, the St. George Illawarra Dragons.

In Round 1 of the 2020 NRL season, he made his debut for North Queensland in their 21–28 loss to the Brisbane Broncos. In Round 3, he scored his first two tries against the Gold Coast Titans in a 36-6 win. In Round 5, Robson became the starting  for the North Queensland side. In Round 9, he scored two tries in a 16–42 loss to the Sydney Roosters. On 24 August, Robson was ruled out for the remainer of the 2020 NRL season after tearing his hamstring. In his first season with the North Queensland side, he played 14 games, scoring five tries.

2021
Robson played 24 games in 2021, scoring six tries.  North Queensland would finish the 2021 NRL season in 15th position on the table narrowly avoiding the Wooden Spoon.

2022
Robson played 26 matches for North Queensland in the 2022 NRL season as the club finished third on the table and qualified for the finals.  Robson played in both finals matches including their preliminary final loss to Parramatta.
On 9 November, Robson signed a two-year contract extension to remain at North Queensland until the end of 2025.

Achievements and accolades

Individual
St George Illawarra Dragons New South Wales Cup Player of the Year: 2018 
NSWRL Under-20 Player of the Year: 2018

Team
2020 NRL Nines: North Queensland Cowboys – Winners

Statistics

NRL
 Statistics are correct to the end of the 2021 season

References

External links
North Queensland Cowboys profile
NRL profile

1998 births
Living people
Australian rugby league players
North Queensland Cowboys players
Rugby league hookers
Rugby league players from Murwillumbah
St. George Illawarra Dragons players